The 1982–83 Houston Cougars men's basketball team represented the University of Houston. The team was led by head coach Guy Lewis, played their home games in the Hofheinz Pavilion in Houston, Texas, and was then a member of the Southwest Conference.

This was the second of Houston's famous Phi Slama Jama teams, led by Michael Young, Larry Micheaux, and future Hall of Famers Clyde Drexler and Akeem Olajuwon. The Cougars swept through the Southwest Conference schedule and were ranked #1 for the final three polls of the 1982–83 season. Riding a 26-game winning streak, they advanced to the 1983 National Championship Game, where they fell 54-52 to Jim Valvano's NC State Wolfpack. Despite the loss, Olajuwon was named Tournament MOP. To date, this remains the last time the MOP was from the losing team.

Roster

Schedule and results

|-
!colspan=12 style=| Regular Season

|-
!colspan=12 style=| SWC Tournament

|-
!colspan=12 style=| NCAA Tournament

Sources

Rankings

Awards and honors
Clyde Drexler, Consensus Second-Team All-American
Akeem Olajuwon, NCAA basketball tournament Most Outstanding Player, Honorable Mention AP All-American
Larry Micheaux, Honorable Mention AP All-American
Michael Young, Honorable Mention AP All-American
Guy Lewis, AP Coach of the Year

Players drafted into the NBA

References

External links
Jamfest for the Ages—2007 ESPN.com article commemorating Phi Slama Jama
Phi Slama Jama: The greatest team to never win it all

Houston Cougars men's basketball seasons
NCAA Division I men's basketball tournament Final Four seasons
Houston
Houston
Houston
Houston